"Sum Bout U" is a single by Atlanta-based rapper 645AR featuring English singer FKA Twigs, released August 4, 2020, by Columbia Records. The song was primarily produced by SenseiATL, with co-production from El Guincho, and came with a music video directed by Aidan Zamiri.

Promotion 
Twigs teased the cover art for the single on August 1.

Style and reception 
Pitchforks Alphonse Pierre notes that while the two artists seem very different, Twigs' distinct falsetto and 645AR's signature squeaky rap style are surprisingly similar. Calling their respective vocals "the highbrow and lowbrow versions of similar styles" and the song an "unhinged duet", Pierre praises the two as "angelic and sweet" and "bizarre, but somehow kind of gentle" respectively. He compares their romantic back-and-forth to that of Usher and Alicia Keys on the chorus of their 2004 duet "My Boo", with "the most romantic squeaks you'll come across" and SenseiATL's colorful '90s R&B-influenced production elevating the lovestruck mood. Consequence of Sounds Lake Schatz notes 645AR as bringing his typical squeak rap style to the song, but with "a more steady R&B vibe" than his other hit songs.

Music video 
The music video, directed by Aidan Zamiri, features 645AR at a computer watching videos on a fictional OnlyFans-styled website called Onlycamzzz, where Twigs dances and poses suggestively while dressed in various anime-inspired costumes, high-end fashion outfits, and a rabbit mask. The video is said to explore digital intimacy and demonstrate the artistic nature of sex work. The video concept was conceived by Twigs and its release coincided with her launching a charitable fundraiser for sex workers. Pitchfork called the video the fourth-best of August 2020 and among the 20 best of the whole year.

Twigs' look in the video was frequently noted for involving very thin eyebrows, part of an ongoing fashion trend that had been revived around the time after having been popular in the late 1990s and early 2000s.

Personnel 
 645AR – vocals, songwriter
 FKA Twigs – vocals, songwriter
 SenseiATL – producer, songwriter, recording engineer, mastering engineer
 El Guincho – co-producer, songwriter
 Alex Tumay – mixing engineer
 Christal Jerez and Nathan Miller – assistant engineers

References 

2020 songs
2020 singles
FKA Twigs songs
Songs written by el Guincho
Song recordings produced by el Guincho
Columbia Records singles
American hip hop songs
American contemporary R&B songs